The 2013–14 Greek Basket League was the 74th season of the Greek Basket League, the highest tier professional basketball league in Greece.

Previous 2012–13 season's results 
Relegated to Greek A2 Basketball League
Peristeri (13th place)
Kavala (14th place)
Promoted from Greek A2 Basketball League
AENK (Champion)
Trikala Aries (2nd place)

Teams, venues, and locations

Regular season

League table

{| class="wikitable" style="text-align: left;"
|- bgcolor=2f4f4f
!width=30 |
!width=170|
!width=30 |
!width=30 |
!width=30 |
!width=30 |
!width=30 |
!width=30 |
!width=30 |
!
|- style="background:#dfd;"
|  || Panathinaikos
||||||||||||||
| rowspan=8 align="center"|Qualified for the Playoffs
|- style="background:#dfd;"
|  || Olympiacos
||||||||||||||
|- style="background:#dfd;"
|  || Panionios
||||||||||||||
|- style="background:#dfd;"
|  || PAOK
||||||||||||||
|- style="background:#dfd;"
|  || AENK
||||||||||||||
|- style="background:#dfd;"
|  || KAOD
||||||||||||||
|- style="background:#dfd;"
|  || Aris
||||||||||||||
|- style="background:#dfd;"
|  || Apollon Patras
||||||||||||||
|- bgcolor=
|  || Rethymno Aegean
||||||||||||||
|- bgcolor=
|  || Kolossos Rodou
||||||||||||||
|- bgcolor=
|  || Trikala Aries
||||||||||||||
|- bgcolor=
|  || Panelefsiniakos
||||||||||||||
|- style="background:#fdd;"
|  || Ilysiakos
||||||||||||||
| rowspan=2 align="center"|Relegation to Greek A2 Basket League
|- style="background:#fdd;"
|  || Ikaros Chalkidas
||||||||||||||
|-

 Olympiacos started the season with a -2 points penalty in the standings.

Results

Playoffs 

Teams in bold won the playoff series. Numbers to the left of each team indicate the team's original playoff seeding. Numbers to the right indicate the score of each playoff game.

Bracket

Final league standings

Individual statistics
The Greek Basket League counts official stats leaders by stats totals, and not by per game averages. It also counts the total stats for both regular season and playoffs combined.

Points

Rebounds

Assists

Source widgets.baskethotel.com/site/esake

See also
2013–14 Greek A2 Basket League (2nd tier)

References

External links 
 Official Basket League Site 
 Official Basket League Site 
 Official Hellenic Basketball Federation Site 

Greek Basket League seasons
1
Greek